Thomas John Henry Richards (15 March 1910 – 19 January 1985) was a Welsh athlete who competed mainly in the Marathon. He competed for Great Britain in the 1948 Summer Olympics held in London, Great Britain in the Marathon where he won the Olympic Silver medal. He was born in Upper Cwmbran.

References 
 Tom Richards at Sports-Reference.com

1910 births
1985 deaths
Sportspeople from Torfaen
Welsh male long-distance runners
Welsh male marathon runners
Olympic athletes of Great Britain
Olympic silver medallists for Great Britain
Athletes (track and field) at the 1948 Summer Olympics
Medalists at the 1948 Summer Olympics
Welsh Olympic medallists
Commonwealth Games competitors for Wales
Athletes (track and field) at the 1950 British Empire Games
Olympic silver medalists in athletics (track and field)